The 2019 USATF U20 Outdoor Championships was the 48th edition of the annual national championship in outdoor track and field for American athletes aged under 20, organized by USA Track & Field. The three-day competition took place on June 21–23 in at the Ansin Sports Complex in Miramar, Florida. It was the fifth time that the event was held in Florida, the previous occasion being in 1994.

Qualification
To enter an event at the national competition, athletes must achieve the event's entry standard performance. The qualifying period for performances runs from Friday, June 15, 2018 to Sunday, June 16, 2019 for all events, except race walk. The race walk qualifying window closes a week earlier on Sunday June 9, 2019.

Results

Men's track

Men's field

Women's track

Women's field

Pan American U20 team selection

The event served as the selection meet for the United States team for the 2019 Pan American U20 Athletics Championships. In order to be entered, athletes needed to finish in the first two of their event at the national meet and also achieve an international qualifying standard mark. The United States team, as managed by USATF, can also bring a qualified back up athlete in case one of the team members is unable to perform.

References

Results
USATF Junior Championships - Ansin Sports Complex Results. USATF.

2019
USA Outdoors
Track, Outdoor
Sports competitions in Florida
USA Outdoor Track and Field Championships
Track and field in Florida